Cymbopogon commutatus is a perennial grass species, commonly known as incense grass, aromatic rush, camel's hay, or lemon grass. Its range extends from South Asia to parts of Africa and Arabia. Foliage has a sweet lemony odor when mashed. It appeared on a 4 riyal Qatari stamp. It is used for medicinal purposes in northeastern Arabia.

Cymbopogon commutatus has been used as a component in soap, as it produces citronella oil. Cymbopogon commutatus is also used to create insect repellant.

References

commutatus
Grasses of Africa
Grasses of Asia
Grasses of Pakistan
Flora of North Africa
Flora of the Arabian Peninsula
Flora of Iran
Flora of Qatar